The Chevrolet Monza (Chinese: 科鲁泽 keluze) is a compact sedan produced by General Motors through its SAIC-GM joint venture under the Chevrolet brand. Prior to the introduction of the vehicle, the Monza nameplate was previously used in the 20th century for unrelated compact models in the North and South American markets. It is the successor of the fourth generation Chevrolet Cavalier, which previously used the 科沃兹 kewozi name. The 科沃兹 kewozi name is now used for the Chevrolet Onix, and positioned below the Monza.

History 

The Monza debuted in November 2018 at the Guangzhou Auto Show. Since 21 March 2019, it is sold in China. It is built on the GM-PATAC K platform that the Buick Excelle GT and the Buick GL6 use.

In Mexico, starting in late 2021, Chevrolet will import the Monza as the Cavalier Turbo. It is positioned above the Onix and will replace the previous generation Cavalier. It is available in three trim levels; LS, LT, and RS.

The model was restyled for the 2023 model year in China, undergoing an update facelift also adding a mild-hybrid version.

Specifications 
The Monza is available in two trim levels (the 320T and the 330T) and in five models overall. The 320T is available with a 1.0-litre turbocharged three-cylinder engine while the 330T gets a 1.3-litre turbocharged three-cylinder engine. 1.0-litre models receive either a 6-speed manual or a 6-speed dual-clutch gearbox while the 1.3-litre models are only available with a 6-speed automatic gearbox. Another trim level (320) was added featuring a 1.5-litre four-cylinder DVVT engine in the 2021 lineup.

Engines

References

External links 

 

Cars of China
Monza
Compact cars
Sedans
Cars introduced in 2019
2010s cars
2020s cars